Descendants 3 is an American musical fantasy television film, and the third installment in the Descendants series, following Descendants and Descendants 2. It is written by Sara Parriott and Josann McGibbon, and is directed by Kenny Ortega. The film premiered on Disney Channel on August 2, 2019, and in other parts of the world on October 12, 2019.

Plot

Mal, Evie, Jay, and Carlos visit the Isle of the Lost to choose four new villain kids (VKs) to take to Auradon. They pick Dizzy, granddaughter of Lady Tremaine; Celia, daughter of Dr. Facilier; and Squeaky and Squirmy, the twin sons of Mr. Smee. As the older VKs return to Auradon, Hades attempts to break through the Isle's barrier, but Mal stops him.

The day the kids are to be picked up, Ben, Mal's boyfriend and the king of Auradon, proposes to her, and she accepts. Ben's ex-girlfriend Audrey seethes with jealousy, and her grandmother Queen Leah admonishes her for failing to secure the family legacy by marrying Ben. Unable to contain her jealousy, Audrey steals the Queen's crown and Maleficent's scepter from the museum, gaining magical powers and becoming a villain. Following the theft and Hades' escape attempt, Mal suggests that the best way to protect Auradon is to close the Isle's barrier permanently.

Audrey curses Mal with Maleficent's scepter, so she and the other VKs go to the Isle to get Hades' ember, the only artifact powerful enough to break the scepter's curse. Upon entering the Isle, Mal is freed of the curse and Celia gets her into Hades' lair, but Hades thwarts their effort to steal the ember. He is revealed to be Mal's absentee father and reluctantly gives her the ember, warning her to avoid it getting wet as it will not exhibit its full powers for her. While leaving the Isle, Mal and the others are intercepted by Uma, Gil, and Harry, who agree to help after Mal agrees to release all the children from the Isle.

Meanwhile, in Auradon, Audrey attacks Jane's birthday party with a sleeping curse; Chad aligns himself with her, while Jane escapes into the enchanted lake. As the entire kingdom falls under Audrey's spell, she offers to reverse it if Ben will marry her. However, he refuses, prompting Audrey to turn him into a beast and begins turning people to stone. Mal and Uma, vying for the leadership of the VKs, return to Auradon with their friends. Despite their conflict, they eventually work together to find and defeat Audrey. After finding Ben in beast form, Carlos calms him while Jane restores him to human form with the enchanted lake water. At Evie's house, Mal and Uma make amends while Evie wakes Doug with true love's kiss. Audrey traps them in the house, but they are able to reverse Audrey's spell by combining their magic, and they and their other friends reunite.

At the Fairy Cottage, they find only a shell-shocked Chad. When Mal admits her plan to seal off the Isle permanently, the group breaks apart and Celia, learning she can never see her father again, douses the ember. After Evie confronts Mal for lying to her and their friends, they are all suddenly turned to stone, save for Mal. Audrey takes Celia hostage and attacks Mal, who turns into her dragon form. Realizing she is Mal's only hope, Uma combines their magic to reignite the ember; Mal defeats Audrey, who falls comatose, and the curses are lifted. Mal and her friends reconcile, and she convinces Hades to use the ember to revive Audrey. Hades does so, but decries the double standard by which Audrey is immediately forgiven for her crimes as she is not considered a villain. Audrey awakens, and she, Mal and Ben make amends.

Changing her mind, Mal tells Ben that she cannot become queen of Auradon unless she can help the Isle as well. With Ben and Fairy Godmother's approval, Mal replaces the Isle's barrier with a bridge, and the people of the newly merged society celebrate. In the end, Evie is with Doug, Carlos is with Jane, Mal and Ben are engaged, Jay and Gil plan to travel the world together, and Audrey becomes romantically attached to Harry after Uma rejects him.

In a mid-credits scene, Mal, Evie, Jay, and Carlos race across the bridge to the Isle to reunite with their parents.

Cast

 Dove Cameron as Mal, daughter of Maleficent and Hades
 Cameron Boyce as Carlos, son of Cruella de Vil
 Sofia Carson as Evie, daughter of The Evil Queen
 Booboo Stewart as Jay, son of Jafar
 Mitchell Hope as Ben, son of Belle and Beast
 Sarah Jeffery as Princess Audrey, daughter of Princess Aurora and Prince Phillip
 Brenna D'Amico as Jane, daughter of the Fairy Godmother
 Melanie Paxson as the Fairy Godmother, the headmistress of Auradon Prep and Jane's mother
 Thomas Doherty as Harry Hook, son of Captain Hook and ally of Uma
 Dylan Playfair as Gil, son of Gaston and ally of Uma
 Zachary Gibson as Doug, son of Dopey the Dwarf
 Jedidiah Goodacre as Chad Charming, son of Cinderella and Prince Charming
 Anna Cathcart as Dizzy Tremaine, daughter of Drizella Tremaine and granddaughter of Lady Tremaine
 Jadah Marie as Celia, the daughter of Dr. Facilier
 Dan Payne as King Beast, Queen Belle's husband and Ben's father
 Keegan Connor Tracy as Queen Belle, Beast's wife and Ben's mother
 Bobby Moynihan as the Voice of Dude, Carlos' dog who gained the power of speech in Descendants 2

 Cheyenne Jackson as Hades, ruler of the underworld and Mal's father

 China Anne McClain as Uma, daughter of Ursula

Additionally, Judith Maxie reprises her role as Queen Leah, Princess Audrey's grandmother, from the first Descendants film. Christian Convery and Luke Roessler play Squeaky and Squirmy, respectively, the twin sons of Mr. Smee. Also appearing are Jamal Sims as Celia's father Dr. Facilier, Linda Ko as Dizzy's grandmother Lady Tremaine, and Faustino Di Bauda as Squeaky's and Squirmy's father Mr. Smee.

Production 
On February 16, 2018, Disney Channel announced the production of Descendants 3, which Disney scheduled to air in mid-2019. Descendants 3 is written and produced by Sara Parriott and Josann McGibbon, and is directed and executive produced by Kenny Ortega. Wendy Japhet is a producer on the film, with Ortega, Sara Parriott, Josann McGibbon, and Japhet also serving as executive producers. Mark Hofeling and Kara Saun return as production designer and costume designer on the sequel, respectively. In addition to playing Dr. Facilier, Jamal Sims also serves as the film's choreographer, along with Ortega who has served as choreographer for all three Descendants films.

Rehearsals and pre-recording on the film began on April 23, 2018, in Vancouver, British Columbia, Canada. Production began on May 25, 2018. On July 18, 2018, it was reported on social media that production on the film had "officially wrapped". Teen Vogue reported that Descendants 3 will be the last film in the series.

Release 
Promotional footage for the film was released on the film series' official YouTube channel in February 2018. In late May 2019, it was announced that the film would premiere on August 2, 2019.

A related short film, Under the Sea: A Descendants Short Story, which features Mal and Uma facing off in "an epic underwater showdown", was released on September 28, 2018.

On July 11, 2019, Disney announced it was canceling a red carpet premiere originally planned for July 22, 2019, in the wake of Cameron Boyce's death. The film's television premiere went on as scheduled, dedicated to Boyce's memory.

Reception

Descendants 3 was watched by 4.59 million viewers on its August 2, 2019 premiere, with viewership increasing to 8.43 million viewers after three days of delayed viewing. On Rotten Tomatoes the film has an approval rating of  based on  reviews.

Accolades

Soundtrack

Descendants 3 (Original TV Movie Soundtrack) is the soundtrack accompanying the film of the same name. The soundtrack and lead single, "Good to Be Bad", was released on May 31, 2019, along with the pre-order of the soundtrack. The soundtrack was released on August 2, 2019. It reached number 7 on the Billboard 200 album chart, and number 1 on the Billboard Kid Albums chart. The single "Queen of Mean", reached number 49 on the Billboard Hot 100, number 57 on the Canadian Hot 100, and number 89 on the UK Singles Chart. It was the longest charting Descendants song, spending over eight consecutive weeks in the Billboard Hot 100 charts.

Home media 
Descendants 3 was released on DVD on August 6, 2019.

References

External links
 

2019 fantasy films
2010s musical films
2019 television films
2019 films
American fantasy films
American sequel films
Descendants (franchise)
Disney Channel Original Movie films
Films directed by Kenny Ortega
Films shot in Vancouver
Musical television films
Television sequel films
Films based on fairy tales
2010s English-language films
2010s American films